Redeemer is a top-down shooter beat 'em up video game developed by Russian company Sobaka Studio and published by Good Shepherd Entertainment. The game was released for Microsoft Windows on August 1, 2017. An Enhanced Edition  was released for PlayStation 4, Nintendo Switch and Xbox One on July 19, 2019. It was released in Japan on March 5, 2020.

Plot 
Redeemer is a beat em up shooter game, where the player controls a former elite operative Vasily, who is living in a mountain monastery together with other brothers-monks. One day, an evil corporation discovers Vasily's location and tries to get rid of him using local bandits. Almost all the monks in the monastery are killed as a result, including Vasily's old mentor and best friend. Vasily wants to destroy the evil corporation.

Gameplay 
Redeemers gameplay includes a combination of exploration, stealth, and combat. Players move through each location eliminating waves of enemies that stand in the way using any means available. Power-ups and weapon upgrades are dispersed throughout levels. The game features three main types of weaponry (cudgels, sledgehammers and knives). The player can use the environment — special interactive objects in a level, as a weapon, for example chairs, refrigerators, or tables. Vasily can also throw enemies, or grapple attack them, and is able to perform a pounce maneuver on a nearby enemy. When encountering an enemy Vasily can attack or perform a one-button quick kill.

Development and release 
Redeemer was developed by Russian indie game company Sobaka Studio and published by Good Shepherd Entertainment. The game was released for Windows on 1 August 2017 via Steam.

Enhanced Edition 
On 17 July 2017, Sobaka Studio and Buka Entertainment announced an "Enhanced Edition" of Redeemer. It was released on Xbox One, PlayStation 4, Nintendo Switch and Microsoft Windows on July 19, 2019. All existing owners of Redeemer will receive free upgrades to the Enhanced Edition via Steam. Redeemer: Enhanced Edition features new content, including local co-op mode for 2 players,  improvement of some levels' balance and abilities divided by character classes (Monk and Soldier).

Reception 
Redeemer received mixed reviews upon release, with score of 64 for PC version (based on 25 reviews) while user scores were higher with 7.1 for PC version respectively by video game review aggregator Metacritic. Cody Medellin of Worthplaying stated that "For the most part, Redeemer succeeds in delivering an action-packed beat-'em-up experience. Unless players are facing bosses or enemies who are immune to regular attacks, the combat is fast and visceral. The overall game length is good, and although some of the mechanics can be inconsistent, there's enough here to make the experience worthwhile." Justin Clark of GameSpot stated that "Redeemers a game that clearly has its heart in the right place but feels the need to justify or enhance a genre that needs less to succeed than one might think".

References

External links 

2017 video games
Action video games
Beat 'em ups
Hack and slash games
Nintendo Switch games
PlayStation 4 games
Top-down video games
Video games developed in Russia
Windows games
Xbox One games
Buka Entertainment games
Multiplayer and single-player video games